St. Joseph Catholic School is a private Roman Catholic K-12 school in Greenville, Mississippi, under the auspices of the Roman Catholic Diocese of Jackson.  St. Joseph is accredited by CASI/Southern Association of Colleges and Schools, and by the Mississippi Department of Education. All professional instructional and administrative staff are fully licensed. Co-curricular and sports activities are governed by the Mississippi Association of Independent Schools (MAIS). St. Joseph is accredited by the Southern Association of Colleges and Schools (SACS) and by the Mississippi Department of Education.

History
The history of St. Joseph Catholic School began with St. Rose of Lima Academy, founded by Father P.J. Korstenbroek and staffed by the Sisters of Mercy. Located next to the St. Joseph Parish Church, St. Rose was the standard for Catholic education in the Delta for sixty-two years. By 1949 the enrollment had exceeded the space of the building, and St. Joseph Elementary and High School were opened in 1950. In 1964, once again the enrollment and needs of the school family called for another facility. A new elementary school, Our Lady of Lourdes, was constructed on Reed Road. St. Joseph became the combined middle school and high school. St. Joseph High School continued to meet the needs of the students by adding six classrooms for the Middle School in 1965 and an additional four classrooms in 1994.

St. Joseph Catholic High School embarked on an ambitious building project with the construction of a new  St. Joseph Middle/Senior High School located on VFW Road. Where the school is still located to this day.

In early 2015 plans were announced to move the elementary school "Our Lady of Lourdes" to the VFW Road Campus to bring the schools back together as one. Principal Paul Artman Jr. was the principal of St.Joe during the switch and Michelle Gardener was the principal of Lourdes. In 2016 construction was started on two new editions on each wing with four new classrooms in both of the new buildings. The construction on both buildings was continued throughout the summer until the beginning of the next school year forcing the high school to have classes in the gym. The elementary building was the first to open and the Our Lady of Lourdes Building on Reed Road was sold. The school administratively became PK-12 in August of that year. Finally in October 2016 the new addition on the High School and Middle School was finished, and the two schools were back on the same campus together as one.

Classes and Programs 
St. Joseph offers an academic program that includes 16 honors classes in the disciplines of English, mathematics, science, and social studies. Qualified students at the junior and senior levels may enroll in college courses for dual credit at both the secondary and collegiate levels. Students may earn 27 college hours all within the regular school day over two years with a capital outlay of just $15 per credit hour. Qualified students are identified as those who have completed a minimum of 14 Carnegie units with at least an overall B average. Additional academic enrichment and college hours are available through enrollment in the school's Advanced Placement (AP) classes. Students may attend the community's vocational-technical center for skills training as part of their daily class schedule. Offerings there range from mechanical and building trades to office technology and health care. St. Joseph follows a 4-block non-rotating scheduled day.  Students have access to an outstanding venue of co-curricular clubs, organizations, and sports offerings.

2012 Fire 
On an early morning in the early summer of 2012, the original St.Joe campus located at 700 Golf St. in Greenville was destroyed by a fire. The building had been occupied by several organizations after the school moved out, but was rumored empty when the fire took place. The fire was determined to be an electrical fire. The High School portion of the building was completely destroyed, however, the Middle School and Gymnasium were damaged but still intact. The former site has since been razed. The site has not yet been re-purposed and some memory of St.Joe can still be seen when driving by the site, such as the entrance to the parking lot, logos on the football field (visible from Highway 82), and school signs on Golf Street.

Awards 
 College scholarships offerings generally exceed one million dollars to class sizes in the mid to upper thirties. 
 The average ACT Composite Test Score is 21.9.
 International Science Fair participants three consecutive years.
 31 Students Placed in the Regional Science & Engineering Fair.
 There were four State Science Fair winners.
 Regional Scholar Bowl Champions. 
 Principal of the Year Award 2008 and 2009.
 Mississippi High School Activities Association's Sportsmanship Award.
 MHSAA Scholar-Athlete Award four consecutive years. 
 Recipient of Reader's Choice, Best High School.
 2009 Mississippi Governor's Award: Outstanding School-Community Partnership.
 State Baseball Champions 2013.
 2017 MAIS Class AA Football State Champions

References

External links
St. Joseph Catholic School, Greenville

Educational institutions established in 1888
Private K-12 schools in Mississippi
Roman Catholic Diocese of Jackson
Catholic secondary schools in Mississippi
Schools in Washington County, Mississippi
1888 establishments in Mississippi